Musée National Boubou Hama is the national museum of Niger, located in Niamey. It was founded in 1959 as Musée National du Niger. Its first conservator, Pablo Toucet, designed the concept of the museum, according to which it was part of the Culture Valley of Niamey, proposed by Boubou Hama. Adjacent to the museum, also part of the Valley, are the Franco-Nigerien Cultural Center and the Center of Linguistic and Historical Studies by Oral Tradition. The museum is located in a park, it consists of a cultural and a scientific section and a zoo. The museum also hosts temporary exhibitions. The park is popular as a recreational area.

Most of the exhibits represent ethnological, archaeological, and cultural artifacts. In particular, the museum shows traditional dwellings of different Nigerien cultures.

As of 2013, 170,000 visitors visited the museum annually. The museum contains the remains of the Tree of Tenere.

The directors of the museum were
 Pablo Toucet (1959-1974);
 Albert Ferral (1974-1990);
 Mahamadou Kélessi (1990-1992);
 Mariama Hima (1992-1996);
 Mahamadou Kélessi (1996-1999);
 Chaïbou Néino (1999-)

References

Museums in Niger
Ethnographic museums in Africa
Buildings and structures in Niamey
Museums established in 1959
1959 establishments in Africa
Neo-Sudanic architecture